Robert McIntyre (November 20, 1851 - August 30, 1914) was a Scottish-born American clergyman. He served as a Bishop of the Methodist Episcopal Church.

Early life
Robert McIntyre was born on November 20, 1851, in Selkirk, Scotland. He emigrated to the United States at the age of 7 and became an orphan shortly after. He became a bricklayer in Philadelphia and Chicago to save for his education. McIntyre graduated from Vanderbilt University.

Career
McIntyre was the pastor of the Grace Methodist Church and the St James Methodist Church in Chicago; the Trinity Methodist Church in Denver; the First Methodist Church in Los Angeles, California. In 1908, he was elected as a bishop of the Methodist Episcopal Church. As Bishop, he was responsible for Oklahoma, Texas and parts of Kansas.

McIntyre authored a novel and a poetry collection. He was a lecturer at the Chautauqua Institution.

Personal life and death
McIntyre married Ella Chatten. They had a son and two daughters.

McIntyre died on August 30, 1914, in Chicago.

Works

References

1851 births
1914 deaths
Scottish emigrants to the United States
Vanderbilt University alumni
Bishops of the Methodist Episcopal Church
American male poets
19th-century American poets
American male novelists
19th-century American novelists
19th-century American male writers
20th-century Methodist bishops